Niall Livingston (1966-2019) was a British-South African classical scholar and Senior Lecturer in Classics at the University of Birmingham. He won the Gaisford Prize for Greek prose in 1987.

References 

1966 births
2019 deaths
Academics of the University of Birmingham